Ljungkvist is a surname. Notable people with the surname include:

Daniel Ljungkvist (born 1981), Swedish ice hockey player
Fredrik Ljungkvist (born 1969), Swedish jazz musician

See also
Ljungqvist

Swedish-language surnames